From List of National Natural Landmarks, these are the National Natural Landmarks in Wyoming.  There are 6 in total: 3 are canyons, one is a depression, one is a cliff, and the last is a stream that divides and flows into two oceans.

Wyoming
National Natural Landmarks